Eugenia victoriana is a small South American fruit tree of the genus Eugenia. Its common names include guayabilla and sundrop.

Eugenia victoriana has the largest fruit of all known Eugenia species. The tree first flowers in its third or fourth year. The fruits are orange-colored, and have sour flesh and two to four large seeds.

See also
Chicha, a South American drink sometimes prepared with guayabilla fruit

References

victoriana
Trees of Brazil
Trees of Colombia
Crops originating from Colombia